Mullassery Madhavan Kutty Nemom P. O. is a 2012 Malayalam film by Kumar Nanda, starring Anoop Menon and Sonal Devaraj in the lead roles.

Cast
 Anoop Menon as Mullaserry Madhavankuty
 Sonal Devraj as Sitamani, Madhavankutty's wife
 Esther Anil as Devu, Madhavankutty's daughter
 Innocent as Vikraman Nair
 Nishanth Sagar as Viswanathan
 Praveen Prem as Baiju Prathap
  T.P. Madhavan as Narayana Pisharady
 Suraj Venjaramood as Sharavanan
 Shiju as Prathapkumar
 Anoop as Kannan
 Nandhu as Gulabdas
 Bala as Khalid
 Harisree Ashokan as Shasankan
 Janardanan as Ambattu Balagangathara Menon
 Sidharth Siva as Shanker Nath
 Dinesh Prabhakar as Thevara Stephen
 Indrans as Loppez
 Sonia as Anupama
 Kalabhavan Shajohn
 KPAC Lalitha as Mullassery Parvathy Amma, Madhavankutty's mother
 Kalpana as Mariya

References

External links

2010s Malayalam-language films